Angus Primrose (missing at sea, 1980) was a designer and naval architect, whose best known designs for around the world races included Sir Francis Chichester's Gypsy Moth IV (with John Illingworth) and Galway Blazer II (1969) of Commander Bill King.

Biography
Primrose is notable for his contribution to designs that changed some of the thinking behind cruising yachts. His Moody 33 (mk 1) centre cockpit design originated from his work in 1973 with A H Moody & Sons Ltd at Swanwick near Southampton. The boats were built in production by Marine Projects (Plymouth) Ltd, and led to the development of successive models: Moody 30, 36 and 39, all built at Plymouth. The custom Moody 42 was built by Moody's firm in Swanwick, with a centre cockpit and aft cockpit/deck saloon variants. In 1972 Angus Primrose designed the Warrior 35, built by Trident Marine Ltd. The long keel hull was also developed in various forms as the aft cockpit Challenger 35 and the deck saloon version the Voyager 35.

Disappearance
Primrose is presumed to have drowned during a gale "some 180 miles off the South Carolina coast" which sunk his 33 ft yacht (a Moody 33), the Demon of Hamble.

See also 
 Commander Bill King
 Gypsy Moth IV
 List of people who disappeared mysteriously at sea
 Sparkle commissioned by the SPARKS Charity to take open up sailing for disabled people

References

External links 
 Obituary, reprinted in The Old Rendcombian Society Newsletter (April 1981, 7th Issue, P5) from The Times
 Seal Class yachts. Images and descriptions of this class of yachts designed by Primrose between 1970 and 1981.
 Full Article Text by designer and journalist Julian Everitt about the yacht design partnership between Primrose and Illingworth

1938 births
1980s missing person cases
British yacht designers
Missing people
People educated at Rendcomb College
People lost at sea